Unmixed is the second album by house production duo Freemasons. It was released on 29 October 2007, with the lead single "Uninvited" being released one week earlier.

The album is unique, as unlike most DJ/Producers, the tracks are all unmixed full length versions.  In addition, producer samples packs created by the Freemasons were included on a data portion of the album.

Track listing

Samples, covers and interpolations 
 "Uninvited" is a cover of Alanis Morissette's song.
 "If" is a cover of Jackie Moore's song, released in 1973 on her album Sweet Charlie Babe.
 "Nothing But A Heartache" is a cover of The Flirtations' song.
 "Love on My Mind" incorporates lyrics from Tina Turner's song "When the Heartache Is Over" and samples Jackie Moore's song "This Time Baby".
 "Watchin'" incorporates elements from Deborah Cox's song "It's Over Now", released in 1998 on her album One Wish.
 "Love Don't Live Here Anymore" is a cover of Rose Royce's song.
 "Pacific" is a cover of 808 State's track "Pacific State".

2007 compilation albums
Freemasons (band) albums